Providence Christian Academy may refer to:

Providence Christian Academy (Lilburn, Georgia)
Providence Christian Academy (St. Louis, Missouri)
Providence Christian Academy (Murfreesboro)

See also

Providence Christian School (disambiguation)